Benjamin Kiplagat (4 March 1989, Magoro, Bukwo, Uganda) is a Ugandan long-distance runner specializing in the 3000 metres steeplechase.

Kiplagat took up running following the success of Boniface Kiprop, who is from the same village as Kiplagat, in the 2004 World Junior Championships.  He began by competing in the 10,000 metres, but on the advice of his coach, he dropped down to the 1500 and 5000 m.

He made his international debut at the 2006 World Cross Country Championships, having qualified by finishing 6th in the Ugandan Junior Cross Country Championships.  That year he also qualified for the World Junior Championships.  There, he set a new national junior record of 8:35.77, which he then lowered to 8:34.14 in the final, where he finished 6th.

In 2008, he finished 4th in the World Cross Country Championships.  That year, he lowered the Uganda record to 8:16.06 and then 8:14.29 before finishing second in the World Junior Championships.

His 2009 season was disrupted by malaria and typhoid, but he still managed to further lower the Ugandan national record to 8:12.98.  He was again affect by malaria, and a boil on his leg, in 2010, but again lowered the Ugandan record to 8:03.81.  He finished 4th at the 2010 Commonwealth Games.

International competitions

Personal bests
 1500 m – 3:38.86 (Nijmegen 2009)
 3000 m – 7:46.50 (Dakar 2010)
 5000 m – 13:22.67 (Kassel 2007)
 10,000 m – 29:03.1 (Bugembe 2006)
 2000 m st – 5:41.1 (Nairobi 2005)
 3000 m st – 8:03.81 (Lausanne 2010)

References

External links

1989 births
Living people
Ugandan male long-distance runners
Ugandan male steeplechase runners
Olympic athletes of Uganda
Athletes (track and field) at the 2008 Summer Olympics
Athletes (track and field) at the 2012 Summer Olympics
Athletes (track and field) at the 2016 Summer Olympics
Athletes (track and field) at the 2010 Commonwealth Games
Commonwealth Games competitors for Uganda
World Athletics Championships athletes for Uganda
People from Bukwo District
Athletes (track and field) at the 2007 All-Africa Games
African Games competitors for Uganda
20th-century Ugandan people
21st-century Ugandan people